Paramount Chief Mpezeni is the King of the Ngoni people of Zambia's Eastern Province and Malawi's Mchinji district.

Overview
The chieftainship was founded by Zwangendaba, a former general of King Shaka of the Zulu, who fled the mfecane. It is named after the Ngoni warrior-king Mpezeni (also spelt Mpeseni) who rose up in 1897 with over 4000 warriors against the British who were taking control of Nyasaland and North-Eastern Rhodesia, and was defeated. He signed a treaty which allowed him to rule as Paramount Chief of the Ngoni and his successors use his name in the title to this day.

Paramount Chiefs or Inkosi ya makosi (1815 to date)

 Zwangendaba (1815–1848)
 Regency (1848–?)
 Mpezeni I (1848–1900)
 Mpezeni II (1900–1928)
 Mpezeni III (1928–1981)
 Mpezeni IV (1981 to date)

References

Traditional rulers in Zambia